Cutoff or cut off or cut-off may refer to:

Places
 Cut Off, Louisiana, a town in the US
 Cutoff, Georgia, an unincorporated community in the US

Alternative routes (US:Westward Expansion Trails)

 Elliott Cutoff
 Hastings Cutoff
 Lander Cutoff
 Lassen Cutoff
 Meek Cutoff
 Salt Lake Cutoff
 Tucson Cutoff
 Woodbury Cutoff

Clothing and fashion
 Cut-off or kutte, a usually sleeveless decorated jacket
 Crop top, or cutoff, a shirt that exposes the midriff
 Cut-off shorts, long pants that have been cut at the knee level (usually without a hem) to create shorts

Science and technology
 Cut-off (electronics), a state of negligible conduction
 Cutoff (metalworking), a piercing operation used to cut a workpiece from the stock
 Cutoff (meteorology), a high- or low-pressure system stuck in place due to a lack of steering currents
 Cutoff (physics), a threshold value for a quantity
 Cutoff (reference value), a one-sided reference range in health-related fields
 Cutoff (steam engine), the point in the piston stroke at which the inlet valve is closed
 Cutoff frequency, in telecommunications and digital signal processing
 Cutoff grade, in mining, the level of mineral in an ore below which it is not economically feasible to mine it
 Cutoff voltage, the voltage at which a battery is considered fully discharged
 Fuse (electrical) (or cutoff), a type of overcurrent protection device
 Meander cutoff, a course change in a meandering river
 Thermal cutoff, an electrical safety device that interrupts electric current when heated to a specific temperature

Other uses
 Cut-off (poker), the seat to the right of the dealer or button, second best position
 Railroad cutoff, a new railroad line built to replace or supplement an existing route
 Cutoff Mountain, a summit in Montana

See also
 Cutting off, a hazardous driving technique